Henry Grey (17 August 1683 – 9 September 1740)  was a British Whig politician who sat in the House of Commons between 1709 and 1740.

Grey was born as Henry Neville, the younger son of Richard Neville of Billingbear House in Berkshire and his wife Katherine Grey, daughter of Ralph Grey, 2nd Baron Grey of Werke. He travelled abroad in Holland, Germany, Italy and France between 1699 and 1700. In 1707, he changed his surname to Grey by Act of Parliament to inherit the estates of his uncle Ralph Grey, 4th Baron Grey of Werke, in Northumberland.

Grey entered Parliament  for Wendover  at a by-election on 21 November 1709, through the influence of his friend Richard Hampden. He successfully contested this seat at the  1710 British general election, but was defeated when he stood at Orford in the same election. Financial difficulties and attempts to sell his northern estates precluded him from taking an active part in Parliament. He was politically a Whig, and voted against peace with Spain in 1711. He was defeated at Berwick-upon-Tweed at the 1713 British general election, despite the Grey interest in that town, and at a by-election at Wallingford in 1714.

Grey returned to Parliament as MP for Wallingford at a by-election on 1 December 1719. At the 1722 British general election he was defeated at Berkshire, but was returned at a by-election on 11 March 1723 for Berwick-upon-Tweed, where his brother Grey Neville held the other seat. When his brother died later in 1723, he inherited  his brother's estate of Billingbear House.  He was returned at the 1734 British general election for Reading.

Grey married Elizabeth Griffin, daughter of James Griffin, 2nd Baron Griffin of Braybrooke in 1720, but they had no children. He died on  9 September 1740.

References

 

1683 births
1740 deaths
British MPs 1708–1710
British MPs 1710–1713
British MPs 1715–1722
British MPs 1722–1727
British MPs 1734–1741
Members of the Parliament of Great Britain for English constituencies
Whig (British political party) MPs for English constituencies
Henry Grey
People from Waltham St Lawrence
Henry